San José de la Montaña is a district of the Barva canton, in the Heredia province of Costa Rica.

History 
San José de la Montaña was created on 5 July 1954 by Decreto Ejecutivo 35.

Geography 
San José de la Montaña has an area of  km² and an elevation of  metres.

Demographics 

For the 2011 census, San José de la Montaña had a population of  inhabitants.

Transportation

Road transportation 
The district is covered by the following road routes:
 National Route 113
 National Route 114

References 

Districts of Heredia Province
Populated places in Heredia Province